Interstate 290 (I-290) is an auxiliary Interstate Highway in the US state of Massachusetts, maintained by the Massachusetts Department of Transportation (MassDOT). The route begins in Auburn at I-90 as a northward continuation of I-395. It follows an L-shaped route, the nominally western half of which runs north into the city of Worcester, and, upon leaving the city, turns to the east to its eastern terminus at I-495 in Marlborough. Past I-495, the road continues as an unnumbered  connector to the town of Hudson.

Route description
Exit numbers on I-290 are a continuation of I-395 exit numbers. I-290 begins as the continuation of I-395 in Auburn with exits to I-90, Route 12, and the Auburn Mall. I-290 continues north through Worcester into downtown, where Route 146 splits off to the southeast toward Providence, Rhode Island, and I-190 to the north toward the Leominster–Fitchburg area. After Route 146, I-290 has exits for Route 122A, Route 122, downtown, and Route 9. After I-190, I-290 presumes east to a junction with Route 70, then continues over Quinsigamond Lake into Shrewsbury, where it goes northeast. Here, the scenery changes drastically from the Worcester urban area to more wooded areas in Shrewsbury and Northborough. I-290 has a junction with Route 140 and starts east into Boylston and Northborough, where it travels northeast again. I-290 enters Marlborough with an exit for the Solomon Pond Mall and has its final junction with I-495, where it terminates shortly after on Route 85 Connector, which continues into Hudson.

History
Originally, I-290 was to rejoin I-90 in Westborough, roughly where I-495 sits now. However, this route would have run through the town centers of Shrewsbury and Northborough. Additionally, I-290 was intended to be extended past I-495 to I-95/Route 128 in Waltham, but this was canceled under pressure from towns along the planned route. A brief two-lane connector heads to Route 85 as a result of this aborted plan. The interchange with I-495 was originally supposed to be a cloverleaf, but, after the plan was canceled, it was modified with a flyover ramp onto I-495 northbound. In 2004, the former exit 12 (current exit 16) was temporarily closed when the Route 146 highway was under construction between the Massachusetts Turnpike and I-290. It was completed in 2007.

Future

Milepost-based exit numbering
While Massachusetts has used sequential exit numbers since 1964, the 2009 edition of the Manual on Uniform Traffic Control Devices required that all US states submit plans to transition to milepost-based exit numbering by 2012. All interchanges were to be renumbered to milepost-based numbers under a project scheduled to start in 2016. However, this project was indefinitely postponed until November 18, 2019, when MassDOT confirmed that the exit renumbering project will begin, and "dual" milemarkers with I-395 mileage will be installed, in late mid-2020. On July 29, 2021, MassDOT announced that the exit renumbering on I-395 and I-290 will start on August 8, and it lasted for two weeks. The department had stated that it would consider redesignating I-290 as an extension of I-395 if both the exit numbering project and dual mile markers are well-received by motorists.

Exit list
MassDOT is scheduled to replace sequential exit numbers with milepost-based exit numbers beginning in mid-2020.

Gallery

References

External links

 MassDOT Highway Division website
 The Roads of Metro Boston: Worcester Expressway (I-290)

90-2 Massachusetts
90-2
Transportation in Worcester County, Massachusetts
Transportation in Middlesex County, Massachusetts
2 (Massachusetts)
Transportation in Worcester, Massachusetts